First Busey Bank is a bank based in Illinois, United States owned by financial holding company First Busey Holding with its headquarters in Champaign, Illinois.  It has operations in Illinois, Indiana and southwest Florida.

The bank offers a full range of banking services, including commercial, financial, agricultural and real estate loans, and retail banking services, accepting customary types of demand and savings deposits, making individual, consumer, installment, first mortgage and second mortgage loans, offering money transfers, safe deposit services, IRA, Keogh and other fiduciary services, automated banking and automated fund transfers.

Corporate history

Foundation and early years
Busey Bank's story dates back to 1868, when Samuel Busey and two co-founders opened the Busey Brothers and Company Bank.

Busey Brothers & Company Bank opens its doors on January 13, 1868, in Urbana, a young county seat with a population of approximately 2000 people. The financiers took in $9,555.60 that first day. In 1913 the bank receives its state charter, becoming Busey State Bank.

In 1922 trust powers are granted to the Shelby Loan & Trust Company in Shelbyville, Illinois. Pulaski Building and Loan Association opens to assist the St. Louis community with saving money and purchasing homes. Four years later, in 1926, Farm Management Services is created.

In 1935 Busey State Bank joins the FDIC. After weathering the stock market crash and depression, the bank continues without a penny of deposits being lost.

The Bank receives its federal charter on September 1, 1945, becoming Busey First National Bank, the day before World War II ended.

1960-1990s
1963: Celebrating a century of service in Champaign, Trevett-Mattis becomes Bank of Illinois.

1968: On the 100th anniversary of Busey First National Bank, assets exceed $34 million.

1971: Busey First National Bank changes ownership. For the first time, the bank is controlled by someone outside the Busey family.

1975: Busey inaugurates Champaign-Urbana's Sweetcorn Festival, an event that continues to this day.

1980: Busey First National Bank organizes First Busey Corporation as a bank holding company.

1984: FirsTech, Inc. opens to offer lockbox, processing services to large, utility firms.

1987: Busey First National Bank, Champaign County Bank & Trust and City Bank merges to form Busey Bank, a state chartered bank.

1991: Pulaski Building and Loan Association renamed to Pulaski Bank- reflecting their broad array of consumer financial services.

Acquired Empire Capital Corporation: announced October 2, 1992; completed February 28, 1993

1993: Busey Bank celebrates its 125th Anniversary. With assets of $675 million and stockholders’ equity in excess of $53 million, Busey Bank is now one of the largest financial institutions headquartered in East Central Illinois.

1995: Trevett-Mattis, now known as BankIllinois, merges with Champaign National Bank, keeping the name BankIllinois.

1997: Busey Ebank is launched as a fully transactional electronic bank.

1998: First Busey Corporation stock trades on NASDAQ under the symbol BUSE.

Busey Bank expands to Indianapolis, Indiana, creating a loan production office to serve the needs of the community.

Pulaski Financial Corp and First Busey Corp stocks trade on NASDAQ under the symbols PULB and BUSE. Busey farm brokerage is established.

1999: Busey continues expansion in McLean County with the acquisition of Eagle Bank Group (First Federal Savings and Loan of Bloomington). Acquired Eagle BancGroup, Inc., parents of Eagle Bank of Champaign County, N.A., and First Federal Savings & Loan Association ("First Federal") based in Bloomington, Illinois: announced June 30, 1999; completed October 29, 1999

2000-2008
First Busey Corporation's total assets, for the first time in its history, exceeds $1 billion.

2000: Main Street Trust, Inc. forms as a result of the merger of BankIllinois Financial Corporation and First Decatur Bancshares, Inc. Main Street operates 19 banking centers and is the parent company of BankIllinois, First National Bank of Decatur, First Trust Bank of Shelbyville and FirsTech, Inc., a telecommunications bill processing company.

2001: Fort Myers, Florida becomes headquarters for Busey Bank Florida.

2004: Busey Investment Group opens office in Bloomington, Illinois.

BankIllinois and The First National Bank of Decatur merge, taking the name Main Street Bank & Trust.

Acquired First Capital Bankshares, Inc., parents of First Capital Bank based in Peoria, Illinois: announced January 5, 2004; completed June 1, 2004. These banks take the Busey name in mid-2005.

Illinois Bankers Association names Busey Chairman Doug Mills Banker of the Year 2005: Busey Bank Florida acquires Tarpon Coast National Bank with four locations in Charlotte & Sarasota Counties.

2005: Main Street Bank & Trust acquires Citizens First Financial Corporation.

Acquired Tarpon Coast Bancorp, Inc., parents of Tarpon Coast National Bank and its subsidiary Tarpon Coast Financial Services based in Port Charlotte, Florida: announced July 29, 2005; completed February 17, 2006.

2007: First Busey and Main Street Bank and Trust based in Decatur, Illinois merger is finalized on July 31, 2007- Van A. Dukeman is named president and chief executive officer. A new Busey brand is introduced.

2009 Bailout
In March 2009, the U.S. Treasury gave Busey $100 million in exchange for Busey stock as part of the Troubled Asset Relief Program. Busey paid $12.4 million in dividends on the stock. In August 2011, Busey returned $27.4 million to the Treasury and moved the remaining $72.6 million from the TARP program to the Treasury's Small Business Lending Fund, which has fewer restrictions and may require smaller dividends.

This practice of exchanging TARP funds for SBLF funds has been criticized by the TARP Inspector General and members of Congress, as banks can use it to lift the restrictions imposed by TARP even while reducing their small business lending.

2010-Present
First Busey Corporation merges with its subsidiary, Busey Bank, N.A., headquartered in Fort Myers, Florida, becoming Busey Bank.

2011: Busey joins social media—Facebook, Twitter and LinkedIn

2012: The Busey family of financial services expands its offerings by founding Trevett Capital Partners.

Busey associates and their families give back to the community during inaugural Community Promise Week

2013 and 2014: Busey is named among Forbes’ list of America's most trustworthy companies.

Acquired Herget Financial Corp., the holding company for Herget Bank, National Association based in Pekin, Illinois: announced September 26, 2014; completed March 16, 2015.

2015: Herget Bank joins the Busey family of financial services.

Busey is recognized by the Independent Community Bankers of America among the Top 50 Community Bank Leaders in social media for the second consecutive year.

2016: Busey is voted among the Best Banks to Work For in the U.S. and Best Places to Work in Illinois by associates, Best Companies Group, and American Banker Magazine.

Acquired Pulaski Financial Corp., the holding company for Pulaski Bank, National Association based in St. Louis, Missouri. Announced December 4, 2015; completed April 29, 2016.

2017: Acquired First Community Financial Partners, Inc., the holding company for First Community Financial Bank based in Joliet, Illinois. Announced February 6, 2017; completed July 2, 2017.

2018: Acquired Mid Illinois Bancorp, Inc., the holding company for South Side Trust and Bank based in Peoria, Illinois. Announced March 13, 2017; completed March 16, 2018.

2019: Acquired The Banc Ed Corp., the holding company for TheBANK of Edwardsville based in Edwardsville, Illinois. Announced August 22, 2018; completed January 31, 2019.

2021: Acquired Cummins-American Corp., the holding company for Glenview State Bank based in Glenview, Illinois. Announced January 19, 2021; completed June 2, 2019.

2022: Named among America's Best Banks by Forbes Magazine.

Subsidiaries
Busey Bank
Busey Wealth Management
FirsTech, Inc.

References

Banks based in Florida
Banks based in Illinois
Banks established in 1868
Champaign, Illinois
Companies based in Champaign County, Illinois
Companies listed on the Nasdaq